Arthur Nicholas Lindsay Wood (March 29, 1875 – June 1, 1939) was an English sailor who competed in the 1908 Summer Olympics representing Great Britain. He was a crew member of the British boat Cobweb, which won the gold medal in the 8 metre class.

References

External links
profile
Olympic profile

1875 births
1939 deaths
British male sailors (sport)
Sailors at the 1908 Summer Olympics – 8 Metre
Olympic sailors of Great Britain
English Olympic medallists
Olympic gold medallists for Great Britain
Olympic medalists in sailing
Medalists at the 1908 Summer Olympics